San Bernardino is a Romanesque-style, former Roman Catholic church building, for some decades converted to museum, in the town of Asciano, Province of Siena, region of Tuscany, Italy.

History
This church, was once an oratory or chapel, dedicated to San Giovanni Battista, adjacent to the church of San Francesco.  It was property of a hospital of San Giovanni Battista at the site since 1178. The oratory was restored in 1324 by the Commendatore Federigo Spadafuori. It acquired the new title in 1444, with a visit from Bernardino da Siena.  In the 15th century it was owned by the Knights Hospitaller.

References

Churches in the province of Siena
Romanesque architecture in Tuscany
14th-century Roman Catholic church buildings in Italy
Churches completed in 1324